In number theory, more specifically in local class field theory, the ramification groups are a filtration of the Galois group of a local field extension, which gives detailed information on the ramification phenomena of the extension.

Ramification theory of valuations
In mathematics, the ramification theory of valuations studies the set of extensions of a valuation v of a field K to an extension L of K. It is a generalization of the ramification theory of Dedekind domains.

The structure of the set of extensions is known better when L/K is Galois.

Decomposition group and inertia group

Let (K, v) be a valued field and let L be a finite Galois extension of K. Let Sv be the set of equivalence classes of extensions of v to L and let G be the Galois group of L over K. Then G acts on Sv by σ[w] = [w ∘ σ] (i.e. w is a representative of the equivalence class [w] ∈ Sv and [w] is sent to the equivalence class of the composition of w with the automorphism ; this is independent of the choice of w in [w]). In fact, this action is transitive.

Given a fixed extension w of v to L, the decomposition group of w is the stabilizer subgroup Gw of [w], i.e. it is the subgroup of G consisting of all elements that fix the equivalence class [w] ∈ Sv.

Let mw denote the maximal ideal of w inside the valuation ring Rw of w. The inertia group of w is the subgroup Iw of Gw consisting of elements σ such that σx ≡ x (mod mw) for all x in Rw. In other words, Iw consists of the elements of the decomposition group that act trivially on the residue field of w. It is a normal subgroup of Gw.

The reduced ramification index e(w/v) is independent of w and is denoted e(v). Similarly, the relative degree f(w/v) is also independent of w and is denoted f(v).

Ramification groups in lower numbering 
Ramification groups are a refinement of the Galois group   of a finite  Galois extension of local fields. (This is stronger than the primitive element theorem.) Then, for each integer , we define  to be the set of all  that satisfies the following equivalent conditions.
(i)  operates trivially on 
(ii)  for all 
(iii) 

The group  is called -th ramification group. They form a decreasing filtration,

The quotient  is called the tame quotient.

The Galois group  and its subgroups  are studied by employing the above filtration or, more specifically, the corresponding quotients. In particular,
 is unramified.
 is tamely ramified (i.e., the ramification index is prime to the residue characteristic.)

One also defines the function .

Then  induces the injection  where . (The map actually does not depend on the choice of the uniformizer.) It follows from this
 is cyclic of order prime to 
 is a product of cyclic groups of order .

The ramification groups can be used to compute the different  of the extension  and that of subextensions:

If , then . In the terminology of Lazard, this can be understood to mean the Lie algebra  is abelian.

Example: the cyclotomic extension
The ramification groups for a cyclotomic extension , where  is a -th primitive root of unity, can be described explicitly:

where e is chosen such that .

Example: a quartic extension
The conjugates of x1 are  x3 = −x1, x4 = −x2.

A little computation shows that the quotient of any two of these is a unit. Hence they all generate the same ideal; call it .  generates 2; (2)=4.

Now x1 − x3 = 2x1, which is in 5.

Also:

 

and 

 so that the different 

x1 satisfies x4 − 4x2 + 2, which has discriminant 2048 = 211.

Ramification groups in upper numbering 
If  is a real number , let  denote  where i the least integer . In other words,  Define  by

Define
.
 is then called the v-th ramification group in upper numbering. In other words, . Note .
 for all 
(whereas lower numbering is compatible with passage to subgroups.)

Herbrand's theorem
Herbrand's theorem states that the ramification groups in the lower numbering satisfy  (for  where  is the subextension corresponding to ), and that the ramification groups in the upper numbering satisfy .  This allows one to define ramification groups in the upper numbering for infinite Galois extensions (such as the absolute Galois group of a local field) from the inverse system of ramification groups for finite subextensions.

The upper numbering for an abelian extension is important because of the Hasse–Arf theorem. It states that if  is abelian, then the jumps in the filtration  are integers; i.e.,  whenever  is not an integer.

The upper numbering is compatible with the filtration of the norm residue group by the unit groups under the Artin isomorphism.  The image of  under the isomorphism

is just

See also
Finite extensions of local fields

Notes

References
B. Conrad, Math 248A. Higher ramification groups
 

  
 
 

Algebraic number theory